Coenosia is a very large genus of true flies of the family Muscidae.

In Denmark, fungi Strongwellsea tigrinae and Strongwellsea acerosa (from the Strongwellsea genus, order Entomophthorales) infect the flying hosts from the genus Coenosia. Including species Coenosia tigrina and Coenosia testacea. While most fungi spore once the host is dead, with Strongwellsea, the host continues to live for days, carrying out normal activities and socialising with other flies while the fungus consumes its genitals, fat reserves, reproductive organs and finally its muscle, all the while shooting out thousands of spores on to other individuals.

Species

Coenosia acuminata Strobl, 1898
Coenosia agromyzina (Fallén, 1825)
Coenosia alaskensis Huckett, 1965
Coenosia albibasis Stein, 1920
Coenosia albicornis Meigen, 1826
Coenosia albifacies (Johnson, 1922)
Coenosia aliena Malloch, 1921
Coenosia alticola Malloch, 1919
Coenosia ambigua Séguy, 1923
Coenosia ambulans Meigen, 1826
Coenosia antennalis Stein, 1898
Coenosia antennata (Zetterstedt, 1849)
Coenosia anthracina Malloch, 1921
Coenosia apicata Huckett, 1965
Coenosia argentata Coquillett, 1904
Coenosia argenticeps Malloch, 1920
Coenosia armiger Huckett, 1934
Coenosia atrata Walker, 1853
Coenosia atra Meigen, 1830
Coenosia atritibia Ringdahl, 1926
Coenosia attenuata Stein, 1903
Coenosia barbipes Rondani, 1866
Coenosia bartaki Gregor, 1991
Coenosia beschovskii Lavciev, 1970
Coenosia bilineella (Zetterstedt, 1838)
Coenosia bivittata Stein, 1908
Coenosia bohemica Gregor & Rozkosný, 2008
Coenosia bonita Huckett, 1934
Coenosia brevisquama d'Assis-Fonseca, 1966
Coenosia californica (Malloch, 1920)
Coenosia campestris (Robineau-Desvoidy, 1830)
Coenosia canadensis Curran, 1933
Coenosia candida Huckett, 1934
Coenosia cilicauda Malloch, 1920
Coenosia cingulipes (Zetterstedt, 1849)
Coenosia comita (Huckett, 1936)
Coenosia compressa Stein, 1904
Coenosia conflicta Huckett, 1965
Coenosia conforma Huckett, 1934
Coenosia dealbata (Zetterstedt, 1838)
Coenosia demoralis Huckett, 1965
Coenosia distinguens Collin, 1930
Coenosia dorsovittata Malloch, 1920
Coenosia dubiosa Hennig, 1961
Coenosia effulgens Huckett, 1934
Coenosia elegans Huckett, 1965
Coenosia emiliae Lukasheva, 1986
Coenosia errans Malloch, 1920
Coenosia facilis Huckett, 1965
Coenosia femoralis (Robineau-Desvoidy, 1830)
Coenosia flagelliseta Muller, 2019
Coenosia flavibasis Huckett, 1934
Coenosia flavicornis (Fallén, 1825)
Coenosia flavidipalpis Huckett, 1934
Coenosia flavifrons Stein, 1898
Coenosia flavimana (Zetterstedt, 1845)
Coenosia flaviseta Huckett, 1965
Coenosia flavissima Hennig, 1961
Coenosia fontana Huckett, 1966
Coenosia fraterna Malloch, 1918
Coenosia freyi Tiensuu, 1945
Coenosia frisoni Malloch, 1920
Coenosia fulvipes Huckett, 1965
Coenosia fumipennis Huckett, 1934
Coenosia furtiva Huckett, 1934
Coenosia fuscifrons Malloch, 1919
Coenosia fuscipes Huckett, 1965
Coenosia genualis Rondani, 1866
Coenosia globuliseta Pont, 1980
Coenosia gracilis Stein, 1916
Coenosia graciliventris Ringdahl, 1954
Coenosia hucketti Pont, 1988
Coenosia humilis Meigen, 1826
Coenosia imperator (Walker, 1849)
Coenosia impunctata Malloch, 1920
Coenosia incisurata Wulp, 1869
Coenosia infantula Rondani, 1866
Coenosia intacta Walker, 1853
Coenosia intermedia (Fallén, 1825)
Coenosia johnsoni Malloch, 1920
Coenosia karli Pont, 2001
Coenosia lacteipennis (Zetterstedt, 1845)
Coenosia laeta Huckett, 1934
Coenosia laricata Malloch, 1920
Coenosia lata Walker, 1853
Coenosia lineatipes (Zetterstedt, 1845)
Coenosia longimaculata Stein, 1920
Coenosia lyneborgi Pont, 1972
Coenosia macrotriseta Muller & Miller, 2013
Coenosia maculiventris Huckett, 1934
Coenosia means Meigen, 1826
Coenosia minor Huckett, 1965
Coenosia minutalis (Zetterstedt, 1860)
Coenosia mixta Schnabl, 1911
Coenosia modesta Loew, 1872
Coenosia mollicula (Fallén, 1825)
Coenosia nevadensis Lyneborg, 1970
Coenosia nigricoxa Stein, 1920
Coenosia nigridigita Rondani, 1866
Coenosia nigrifemorata Huckett, 1965
Coenosia nigritarsis (Stein, 1898)
Coenosia nigritella Huckett, 1934
Coenosia nivea Loew, 1872
Coenosia nudipes Stein, 1920
Coenosia nudiseta Stein, 1898
Coenosia obscuricula (Rondani, 1871)
Coenosia octopunctata (Zetterstedt, 1838)
Coenosia octosignata Rondani, 1866
Coenosia oregonensis Malloch, 1919
Coenosia pallipes Stein, 1898
Coenosia paludis Tiensuu, 1939
Coenosia patelligera Rondani, 1866
Coenosia pauli Pont, 2001
Coenosia pedella (Fallén, 1825)
Coenosia perpusilla Meigen, 1826
Coenosia perspicua Huckett, 1934
Coenosia pilosissima Stein, 1920
Coenosia praetexta Pandellé, 1899
Coenosia pudorosa Collin, 1953
Coenosia pulicaria (Zetterstedt, 1845)
Coenosia pumila (Fallén, 1825)
Coenosia pygmaea (Zetterstedt, 1845)
Coenosia remissa Huckett, 1965
Coenosia rhaensis Hennig, 1961
Coenosia rubrina Huckett, 1934
Coenosia rufibasis Stein, 1920
Coenosia ruficornis Macquart, 1835
Coenosia rufipalpis Meigen, 1826
Coenosia rufitibia Stein, 1920
Coenosia sallae Tiensuu, 1938
Coenosia semivitta (Malloch, 1918)
Coenosia setigera Malloch, 1918
Coenosia setipes Huckett, 1965
Coenosia sexmaculata Meigen, 1838
Coenosia sexpustulata Rondani, 1866
Coenosia stigmatica Wood, 1913
Coenosia strigifemur Stein, 1920
Coenosia strigipes Stein, 1916
Coenosia styriaca Hennig, 1961
Coenosia tausa Huckett, 1934
Coenosia tendipes Huckett, 1965
Coenosia testacea (Robineau-Desvoidy, 1830)
Coenosia tigrina (Fabricius, 1775)
Coenosia toshua Huckett, 1934
Coenosia transiens Stein, 1901
Coenosia trilineella (Zetterstedt, 1838)
Coenosia verralli Collin, 1953
Coenosia vibrissata Collin, 1953
Coenosia villipes Rondani, 1866
Coenosia wulpi Pont, 1972
Coenosia xanthocera Hennig, 1961

References

Muscidae
Articles containing video clips
Muscoidea genera
Taxa named by Johann Wilhelm Meigen